Jianchangosaurus is a genus of therizinosaurian dinosaur that lived approximately 126 million years ago during the early part of the Cretaceous Period from the Yixian Formation in what is now China. The nearly complete juvenile specimen was missing only the distal tail.

Discovery and naming
The holotype specimen, 41HIII-0308A, was discovered on the Yixian Formation of Jianchang County, in the western part of Liaoning Province and purchased by the Henan Geological Museum noting that some of the elements were repositioned during its preparation. The genus name Jianchangosaurus, means "Jianchang lizard", and is derived from "Jianchang", the name of the county of Liaoning Province, China, where the specimen was found, and the Greek word "" meaning "lizard". The specific name yixianensis, refers to the Yixian Formation where the specimen was found, and the Latin suffix "-ensis" meaning "originating in". Jianchangosaurus was described and named by Hanyong Pu, Yoshitsugu Kobayashi, Junchang Lu, Li Xu, Yanhua Wu, Huali Chang, Jiming Zhang, and Songhai Jia in 2013 and the type species is Jianchangosaurus yixianensis.

Description
 
The holotype specimen of Jianchangosaurus 41HIII-0308A is a nearly complete skeleton of a single juvenile individual, missing only the distal portion of the tail.

Five sacral vertebrae are present in this genus, a condition that is similar to that of other basal therizinosaurs. The humerus measures  in length and is 7% shorter than the scapula. The ulna measures  in length and is 78% of the humerus length - which approximates the ratio observed in the basal therizinosaur Falcarius (77%). The pubis is 20% longer than the ischium, and it projects anteroventrally and does not exhibit the opisthopubic condition. The tibia is 1.5 times longer than the femur, which is the highest ratio known in therizinosaurs, an adaptation which has been strongly correlated with the development of cursorial habits in dinosaurs.

Distinguishing anatomical features
 
According to Pu et al. 2013, Jianchangosaurus can be distinguished based on the presence of 27 tightly packed maxillary teeth; the dorsal border of the antorbital fenestra is formed by the maxilla, nasal, and lacrimal, but with the majority of the border formed by the nasal; there is no participation of jugal in the  margin of the antorbital fenestra; a short diastema is present in the anterior tip of the dentary; dentary teeth have a concave labial surface and a convex lingual surface (this condition is present for all except six anterior teeth); the lack of prominent hypapophyses in the anterior dorsal vertebrae; the anterior caudal centra have an oval cross section and the articular facet is as tall as it is wide; the presence of weakly curved manual unguals with weak flexor tubercles positioned ventral to the articular facet; the ilium is shallow and elongated; the ridge bounding the cuppedicus fossa is confluent with acetabular rim; and there is extensive contact between the pubic apron.

Skull and dentition

The skull is in good preservation and is nearly complete, missing only the ventral lacrimal, the posterior jugal, the postorbital, the anterior edge of the quadrate, and the anterior surangular bones. Jianchangosaurus possesses 27 maxillary teeth and approximately 25 to 28 dentary teeth. The researchers observed, however, that at front of the upper jaw the premaxilla is edentulous and they hypothesized that it was covered by a rhamphotheca. This is also supported by the presence of a series of foramina along the buccal margin on the lateral surface of the premaxilla. By comparison, in most modern birds, the rhamphotheca grows, and is shed, continuously and in some species its color varies depending on the season.

The front portion of the lower jaw is down-turned and in combination with the rhamphotheca on the upper jaw, functioned to pluck food. The skull measures  in length, and is 10% longer than the femur, a condition not shared by Beipiaosaurus. Derived features present in the skull of this genus strongly suggest adaptations for herbivory.

Jianchangosaurus possesses 27 maxillary teeth and approximately 25 to 28 dentary teeth. The crowns on its teeth diminish in size as they progress toward the posterior of the skull. The teeth on the upper jaw, exhibit the conventional dental morphology - in which the surface of the tooth facing the outside of the mouth is convex. The teeth on the lower jaw possess the reversed morphology, where the surface of the tooth facing the outside is concave. Pu et al. 2013 noted that this dental morphology "likely maximized the biting stress during occlusion to cut fibers of plant material, similar to ornithopods and ceratopsians".

Feather impressions
 
The impressions of a series of wide and unbranched feathers were discovered with the fossils. Only the distal ends of the feather impressions are visible. Based on their morphology the feathers are considered primitive and bear resemblance to those found along the neck of Beipiaosaurus, which were collected in the same formation. The authors noted that the "presence of elongated broad filamentous feathers (EBFF) suggests that they might have been used for visual display".

Ontogenetic stage
The only known Jianchangosaurus skeleton is that of a juvenile individual. The morphological evidence supporting ontogenetic immaturity consists of the observation that the neurocentral sutures are open (i.e. not fused) in all of the cervical and dorsal vertebrae, as well as in the cervical ribs and in the sacral centra. The scapula and coracoid are also unfused, which the authors indicate may be an ontogenetic feature in Jianchangosaurus also suggesting that is a juvenile. This condition, however, is also observed in adult basal therizinosaurs.

Classification
Like the primitive Falcarius and Beipiaosaurus, Jianchangosaurus was classified as a basal therizinosaur. Phylogenetic analysis suggests that it is more derived than Falcarius but more primitive than Beipiaosaurus. Jianchangosaurus is the only known therizinosaur that possesses a tail with caudal centra that are oval in shape.

Left cladogram is based on the phylogenetic analysis conducted by Pu et al. 2013, showing the relationships of Jianchangosaurus as a very primitive therizinosaur. Right cladogram is based on Hartman et al. 2019 which has corroborated the position of Jianchangosaurus:

See also
 Timeline of therizinosaur research

Notes

References

Therizinosaurs
Fossil taxa described in 2013
Early Cretaceous dinosaurs of Asia
Feathered dinosaurs
Yixian fauna
Taxa named by Lü Junchang